Corinth is an abandoned ghost town in Sumter County, Georgia, United States.

References

Geography of Sumter County, Georgia
Ghost towns in Georgia (U.S. state)